Antonio Jose Nieves (born May 25, 1987) is an American professional boxer who challenged for the World Boxing Organization junior bantamweight title in 2017.

Amateur career
Nieves is a multiple-time Cleveland Golden Gloves open champion and was national runner-up in 2011.

Regional title
As Nieves rose in the rankings he defeated multiple-time world title challenger Lorenzo Trejo.  He defeated Oscar Mojica to win the North American Boxing Organization bantamweight title.

On March 10, 2017 Nieves defend his North American Boxing Organization title against Nikolai Potapov on ShoBox.  He lost the defense by split decision.

World title attempt
Nieves fought Naoya Inoue for the WBO junior bantamweight world title.  He lost by 6th round technical knockout due to a corner stoppage.

Professional boxing record

Personal life
He works for PNC Bank as a personal banker.  He lost his sister in October, 2016 as a murder victim.

References

External links

1987 births
Living people
Bantamweight boxers
Boxers from Ohio
American male boxers